Laufenthal is a village in the Upper Palatinate (Bavaria, Germany), belonging to the administrative district (Landkreis) of Regensburg and the market town of Hemau.  Technically a ward (Ortsteil) of Hemau, Laufenthal lies about five kilometers from the town, near the river Laaber.  It has a medieval castle, and the remains of a Celtic settlement (Keltenschanze see: Nemeton). The village church, dedicated to St Ottilia, belongs to the parish of Hohenschambach.

External links
Map
Homepage of Schloss Laufenthal
St Ottilia Church

Regensburg (district)
Villages in Bavaria